Richard Walters may refer to: 
 Richard Walters (singer-songwriter), English songwriter, singer and musician
 Slick Rick (Richard Walters, born 1965), British-American rapper
 Richard Leroy Walters (1931–2007), philanthropist
 Richard John Walters (born 1961), American film and television actor
 Dick Walters (born 1946/1947), basketball coach
 Richard Walters, actor  best known as Tiny on Degrassi and Degrassi: Next Class

See also
Rick Walters (disambiguation)
Richard Walter (disambiguation)